Wakuarori is a village in northern-central Maré Island, in the Loyalty Islands of New Caledonia. It lies south by road from Tenane and east of Hnawayaca.

References

Populated places in Maré Island